The Roman Catholic Archdiocese of Cuiabá is an archdiocese located in the city of Cuiabá in Brazil.

History
 December 6, 1745: Established as Territorial Prelature of Cuiabá from the Diocese of São Sebastião do Rio de Janeiro
 July 15, 1826: Promoted as Diocese of Cuiabá
 March 10, 1910: Promoted as Metropolitan Archdiocese of Cuiabá

Bishops

Ordinaries, in reverse chronological order
 Archbishops of Cuiabá (Roman rite)
 Archbishop Mílton Antônio dos Santos, S.D.B. (2004.06.09 – present)
 Archbishop Bonifácio Piccinini, S.D.B. (1981.08.15 – 2004.06.09)
 Archbishop Orlando Chaves, S.D.B. (1956.12.18 – 1981.08.15)
 Archbishop Francisco de Aquino Correa, S.D.B. (1921.08.26 – 1956.03.22)
 Archbishop Carlos Luiz d’Amour (1910.03.10 – 1921.07.09)
 Bishops of Cuiabá (Roman Rite)
 Bishop Carlos Luiz d’Amour (later Archbishop) (1877.09.21 – 1910.03.10)
 Bishop José Antônio dos Reis (1832.07.02 – 1876.10.11)
 Bishop José Maria Macerata (1826.07.15 – 1831)
 Prelates of Cuiabá (Roman Rite)
 Bishop José Maria Macerata (1823–1826.07.15)
 Bishop Luiz de Castro Pereira, C.S.J. (1804.10.29 – 1822.08.01)
 Bishop José Nicolau de Azevedo Coutinho Gentil (1782.01.23 – 1788.03.07), appointed Prelate of Goiás

Coadjutor bishops
Cyrillo de Paula Freitas (1905-1911), did not succeed to see; appointed Bishop of Corumbá, Mato Grosso do Sul
Bonifácio Piccinini, S.D.B. (1975-1981)
Mílton Antônio dos Santos, S.D.B. (2003-2004)

Auxiliary bishops
Francisco de Aquino Correa, S.D.B. (1914-1921), appointed Archbishop here
Antônio Campelo de Aragão, S.D.B. (1950-1956), appointed Bishop of Petrolina, Pernambuco

Suffragan dioceses
 Diocese of Barra do Garças
 Diocese of Diamantino
 Diocese of Juína
 Diocese of Primavera do Leste–Paranatinga
 Diocese of Rondonópolis-Guiratinga
 Diocese of São Luíz de Cáceres
 Diocese of Sinop
 Territorial Prelature of São Félix

Sources
 GCatholic.org
 Catholic Hierarchy
 Archdiocese website

Roman Catholic dioceses in Brazil
Roman Catholic ecclesiastical provinces in Brazil
 
Religious organizations established in 1745
Dioceses established in the 18th century
1745 establishments in Brazil